Qin He (born December 14, 1984 in Guangxi) is a male Chinese freestyle wrestler who will compete at the 2008 Summer Olympics.

He personal best was coming 5th at the 2007 World Championships -  60 kg freestyle and came in 2nd in the 2009 National Games - freestyle men's\60kg.

External links
profile

1984 births
Living people
Olympic wrestlers of China
Chinese male sport wrestlers
Sportspeople from Guangxi
Wrestlers at the 2008 Summer Olympics
21st-century Chinese people